The Southern Athletic Association (SAA) is a college athletic conference in NCAA Division III that began play in the 2012–13 school year.  It was formed in 2011 by seven former members of the Southern Collegiate Athletic Conference and independent Berry College.

History

Chronological timeline
 2011 - The Southern Athletic Association (SAA) was founded, whose charter members include seven member schools that were competing for the Southern Collegiate Athletic Conference (SCAC): (Birmingham–Southern College, Centre College, Hendrix College, Millsaps College, Oglethorpe University, Rhodes College and Sewanee: The University of the South), and NCAA Division III independent Berry College, with competition to begin effective in the 2012-13 academic year.
 2015 - The University of Chicago and Washington University in St. Louis joined the SAA as affiliate members for football, effective in the 2015 fall season (2015-16 school year).
 2017 - Chicago and Washington (Mo.) left the SAA as affiliate members for football, effective after the 2016 fall season (2016-17 school year).
 2017 - Austin College and Trinity University joined the SAA as affiliate members for football, effective in the 2017 fall season (2017-18 school year).
 2021 - Austin College left the SAA as an affiliate member for football, effective after the 2020 fall season (2020-21 school year).
 2021 - Southwestern University of Texas will join the SAA as an affiliate member for football, effective beginning the 2023 fall season (2023-24 school year).
 2023 - Trinity University and Southwestern University of Texas will join the SAA as full members, beginning in the fall of 2025.

Member schools
Every member in the history of the SAA, whether current, former, full, or associate, has been a private school.

Current members
The SAA currently has eight full members.

Future full members

Affiliate members
Two schools, the University of Chicago and Washington University in St. Louis (WashU), announced their intention to become affiliate members of the conference for football, effective in 2015. Both are members of the University Athletic Association (UAA), which at the time had a football scheduling alliance with the North Coast Athletic Conference (NCAC). However, after the 2012 season, the NCAC adopted a full round-robin football schedule, making it impossible for that conference to fill in all of its non-conference dates with the four UAA members that sponsor the sport.

Over the summer of 2015, Chicago and WashU announced that they would leave the SAA after two seasons of competition in order to join more geographically-convenient conferences. WashU will maintain its football affiliation with the UAA for the 2017 season before joining the College Conference of Illinois and Wisconsin in 2018 as a football-only member. For nearly a year, Chicago did not announce a future league affiliation, but it announced in May 2016 that it would become a football-only member of the Midwest Conference in 2017.

On November 18, 2015, Trinity University (Texas) and Austin College announced  they would affiliate with the SAA for football, renewing a relationship that was lost when the SAA split from the Southern Collegiate Athletic Conference.  As a result, the SCAC will no longer offer football as a sport from 2017.  On August 13, 2020, Austin College announced it would move to the American Southwest Conference as a football-only affiliate beginning with the 2021 season, committing to at least four years as an affiliate. 

On August 19, 2021, the conference announced that Southwestern University, a current football-only affiliate member of the American Southwest Conference, would join the SAA as a football-only affiliate effective with the 2023 football season. On March 9, 2023, the SAA announced that Southwestern University and Trinity University (Texas) will join the SAA as full members in 2025.

Current 
The SAA currently has one affiliate member, who will join as a full member in 2025.

Notes

Future 
One school is scheduled to become an affiliate member in 2023. Southwestern will become a full member in 2025.

Former affiliate members
Three schools have been SAA affiliate members but have since left the conference.

Membership timeline

Blue = Full member, Green = Full member except football, Red = Associate member for football

References

External links

 
2011 establishments in Georgia (U.S. state)